Paul Bishop (born 5 July 1967) is an English former professional rugby league footballer who played for Warrington, Cronulla Sharks, St Helens, Gold Coast Seagulls and Halifax.

Early life
Born in England, Bishop moved to Australia at an early age when his father, Tommy Bishop, signed for Cronulla Sharks in 1969. When his father returned to England in the early 1980s, Bishop played junior rugby league for Thatto Heath. On his 17th birthday, he was signed by Warrington.

Playing career

Warrington
Bishop made his debut for Warrington in October 1984, scoring a try and kicking seven goals in a 42–30 win against Workington Town.

On 11 May 1986, in the semi-final of the 1985–86 Rugby League Premiership, Bishop scored a record-equalling five drop goals in a 23–10 win against Wigan. A week later in the final, he scored a try and five conversions in a 38–10 win against Halifax. He also played in the 1986–87 Rugby League Premiership final the following year, but were this time defeated by Wigan.

He then spent parts of the next two seasons in Australia, making 13 first grade appearances for Cronulla Sharks in the 1988 and 1989 NSWRL seasons.

Bishop played at scrum-half for Warrington in the 1990 Challenge Cup final, but the team were defeated 14–36 by Wigan. He made his final appearance for the club in October 1990.

St Helens
Bishop joined St Helens in 1990. He played in the Challenge Cup for the second consecutive year in 1991, but was once again a losing finalist against Wigan.

In the following season, Bishop played in the 1991–92 Lancashire Cup final, scoring a try and two goals in a 24–14 win against Rochdale Hornets.

Halifax
In 1992, Bishop was signed by Halifax. Bishop left the club in 1994 and returned to Australia.

References

External links
 Statistics at wolvesplayers.thisiswarrington.co.uk
 Paul Bishop at Saints Heritage Society

1967 births
Living people
English rugby league players
Rugby league halfbacks
Warrington Wolves players
Cronulla-Sutherland Sharks players
St Helens R.F.C. players
Gold Coast Chargers players
Halifax R.L.F.C. players